The Salma caldera is a late Proterozoic caldera complex in the northeastern Arabian Shield of Saudi Arabia. It encompasses rhyolitic volcanic rocks, a peralkaline ring intrusion that rose along a fracture formed during caldera collapse, and a younger resurgent metaluminous and peraluminous granite core.

References

Volcanoes of Saudi Arabia
Proterozoic calderas